Jeanne Hristou (born 7 January 1981) is a Greek fencer. She competed in the women's individual and team épée events at the 2004 Summer Olympics.

References

1981 births
Living people
Greek female épée fencers
Olympic fencers of Greece
Fencers at the 2004 Summer Olympics
21st-century Greek women